Hlwan Paing (born 1 March 1989) is a Burmese singer-songwriter, composer and actor. He is notorious for leaving his previous 13-year-long relationship just to date with a Co-worker,”Naw Phaw Eh Htar”.He is considered one of the most successful Burmese singers and rose to fame with his debut album Done Pyan (Rocket) which was a duo album with Bobby Soxer. Hlwan Paing is also active a gaming streamer and started online streaming in 2018 by using his online alias Bo Paing Gyi.

Early life and education
Hlwan Paing was born on 1 March 1989 in Taunggyi, Shan State, Myanmar. He is the youngest son of three siblings. His elder brother Kyaw Hsu is also an actor. He graduated from Technological University, Thanlyin.

Music career

2005–2009: Career beginnings
Hlwan Paing began his music career as a member of the underground outfit 89, while still a university, composing songs and singing together. Shortly after, he was first contacted by Ah Boy, who was a member of Rock$tar group. He became last member of Rock$tar. Since then he started working with mainstream artists. He has unique style of creating music, writing songs and reciting rapping lyrics. He was only one recognized twister in Myanmar.

2009–2014: Recognition and collaborative success
Hlwan Paing gained recognition in 2009 when he was picked as one of the featured artists for Ye Lay's song "Ma Nhoute Sat Chin Bu" (Do Not Want To Say Good Bye), a song from the album "Tat Ta Ya Kar Yan" (Third Rhyme), he feat hip-hop rapping in the song. He got his big break in music industry with his hit songs "Done Pyan" and "Bo Kay", songs from the "Done Pyan" album. The song "Uptown Girl" which is associated with Yair Yint Aung, the song "A Girl of a Boy"  which is associated with Bunny Phyoe and the song "The Letter For Friend" which is single one were also popular among teenager audiences.

He released an album "Done Pyan" (Rocket) which was a duo album with his partner Bobby Soxer on 21 November 2011. This album won the "Best Music Album Award", awarded by both Shwe FM and City FM. They donated 1 million Myanmar Kyats from selling gained gold prize to orphan children from Thu Kha Yike Myone charity organization. Since he has released a dual album, he engaged in shooting commercial advertisements, stage performances, and many concerts at various locations throughout Myanmar.

He sang a song "Ko Ko" together with Bobby Soxer and Eaint Chit and that song won the "Best Music Award" from the Shwe FM Music Awards.

2014–present: Solo debut and rising popularity
In 2014, Hlwan Paing started endeavoring to be able to produce and distribute a solo album. He launched his debut solo album "Gi Ta Sar So Hlwan Paing" on 8 June 2014 which spawned more huge hits. Many awards and music industry records have followed since then. The follow-up video album was released on 12 February 2016. One of the songs from that album "Min Ye Kyaw Swar Bo Nay Toe" which became widely popular and hit in Myanmar since the day, and converting to a film.

He released his second solo album "Gita Bay Da" on 24 June 2017.

Acting career

2014–2015: Acting career beginnings
Hlwan Paing has been presenting and acting in a travel documentary called "Let's Go" together with other artists, Bunny Phyoe, Kyaw Htut Swe, Nann Thu Zar, Nan Myat Phyo Thin, and Bobby Soxer.

2015–present: Acting debut and breaking into the big screen
While he planned to present in Let's Go To Europe, he made his acting debut with a leading role in the film Old Jacket, alongside Khin Wint Wah and directed by Aung Zaw Lin, film released in February 2016. In 2015, he starred in his second film 67 Plaza, alongside Kaew Korravee, released in June 2018.

In 2016, he made his big-screen debut in the film Kyway, alongside Ei Chaw Po and Tyron Bejay. The film was based on the novel Pyaw Tine Yone Tak Pote Thin Nyo by Min Lu and directed by Thar Nyi which premiered in Myanmar cinemas on 20 July 2018.

In 2017, he starred in romantic film Nga Ko Nann Tae Mone Tine (The Storm That Kissed Me) where he played the leading role with Phway Phway and Yair Yint Aung, which premiered in Myanmar cinemas on 1 June 2018. The film which was a huge commercial hit slot nationally, topping film ratings and becoming the most watched film at that time. His portrayal of the character earned praised by fans for his acting performance and character interpretation, and experienced a resurgence of popularity.

The same year, he portrayed the male lead in the film Ko Saung Nat, alongside Khin Wint Wah and Htoo Aung, directed by Win Lwin Htet, written novel and produce by himself. The film was premiered in Myanmar cinemas on 28 December 2018 which was a success and achieved a cult following.

Brand Ambassadorships
Hlwan Paing was appointed as brand ambassador of Ve Ve on 28 February 2015 and also as brand ambassador of Vivo-Y55 smart phone in 2016.

Awards
 "Best Selling Album Award of Year 2013", with album Done Pyan, awarded by Shwe FM
 "Best Selling Album Award of Year 2014", with album Gi Ta Sar So Hlwan Paing, awarded by Shwe FM
 "Most Popular Male Vocalist Award of Year 2014", awarded by City FM
 "Best Rap Song of the Monsoon (Artist Choice Award)" with song Ko Ko, awarded by Myanmar Music Awards 2014 (MMA)
 "Freshest Rap Song of the Monsoon (People Choice Award)" with song Ko Ko, awarded by Myanmar Music Awards 2014 (MMA)
 "Best MTV Award" with song Ngar Doe Way, awarded by Myanmar Music Awards (MMA) at 2014
 "Best Selling Male Artist Album Award of Year 2017", with album Gita Bay Da, awarded by City FM

Filmography

Film (Cinema)
The Storm that Kissed Me (2018)
Kyway (2018)
My Rowdy Angel (2018)
Yat Kyaw Ywar Kyaw (2019)

Film
Old Jacket (2016)
67 Plaza (2018)
Yat Kyaw Ywar Kyaw (TBA)

Discography

Solo albums
Gi Ta Sar So Hlwan Paing (2014)
Gita Bay Da (2017)

Duo albums
Done Pyan (2011)

Personal life
Hlwan Paing has been in a relationship with hip hop singer Bobby Soxer since 2009.

References

External links

1989 births
Living people
21st-century Burmese male actors
21st-century Burmese male singers
Burmese singer-songwriters
Male rappers
Burmese rappers
People from Taunggyi